Posada de Llanes is a parish in Llanes municipality, in eastern Asturias, Spain.

Parishes in Llanes